Raghavendra stotra is a hymn (stotra) composed by Appanacharya, an ardent devotee of Raghavendra Swami in praise of his guru . It is also known as Sri Raghavendra stotra, or the Guru stotra. The Sanskrit verse, comprising 32 ślokas, is recited till today by followers of Raghavendra Swami and other Dvaita Vaishnavas.

References

Further reading

 

Hindu devotional texts
Dvaita Vedanta